Geha is an Arabic surname. It may refer to:

Persons
Cyril VIII Geha or Cyril VIII Jaha (1840–1916), patriarch of the Melkite Greek Catholic Church from 1902 until 1916
Joseph Geha (born 1944), professor-emeritus and author

Others
Geha Interchange, the confluence of Highway 4 and Road 481 in Israel
Highway 4 (Israel), a section of which is known as the Geha Highway,  an Israeli highway that runs along Israel's entire coastal plain of the Mediterranean Sea
GEHA (Government Employees Health Association), self-insured association providing health and dental plans to US federal employees and retirees